Royden Barrie was a pseudonym used by the American lyricist Rodney Bennett (1890 – 1948), father of the composer Richard Rodney Bennett. Barrie was also a children's book author.

Under this name, he wrote many song-lyrics for Eric Coates and Roger Quilter among others.

References

1890 births
1948 deaths
American male songwriters
American lyricists
20th-century American composers
20th-century American male musicians